These are the New Territories West results of the 2000 Hong Kong legislative election. The election was held on 10 September 2000 and all 6 seats in New Territories West, which consists of Tsuen Wan District, Tuen Mun District, Yuen Long District, Kwai Tsing District and Islands District, were contested. The Democratic Party first applied electoral strategy of dividing three candidate lists in order to avoid wasted votes, as largest remainder method encouraged. Lee Wing-tat failed to be re-elected, losing votes to another Democratic ticket of Albert Chan, while the last seat was won by Tang Siu-tong of the Hong Kong Progressive Alliance who stood with the Democratic Alliance for the Betterment of Hong Kong ticket.

Overall results
Before election:

Change in composition:

Candidates list

See also
Legislative Council of Hong Kong
Hong Kong legislative elections
2000 Hong Kong legislative election

References

Elections in Hong Kong
2000 Hong Kong legislative election